Litopenaeus is a genus of prawns, formerly included in the genus Penaeus. It contains five species:
Litopenaeus occidentalis (Streets, 1871)
Litopenaeus schmitti (Burkenroad, 1936)
Litopenaeus setiferus (Linnaeus, 1767)
Litopenaeus stylirostris (Stimpson, 1871)
Litopenaeus vannamei (Boone, 1931)

Parasites
Litopenaeus is a suspected host of Vibrio parahaemolyticus, a pathogen of humans.

References

Penaeidae